The Richat Structure, also called Guelb er Richât is a prominent circular geological feature in the Sahara's Adrar Plateau, near Ouadane, west–central Mauritania, Northwest Africa. In the local dialect, rīšāt means feathers and it also is known locally in Arabic as tagense. Tagense refers to the circular opening of the leather pouch used to draw water from local wells.

It is an eroded geological dome,  in diameter, exposing sedimentary rock in layers that appear as concentric rings. Igneous rock is exposed inside and there are spectacular rhyolites and gabbros which have undergone hydrothermal alteration, and a central megabreccia. The structure is also the location of exceptional accumulations of Acheulean archaeological artifacts. It was selected as one of the first 100 geological heritage sites identified by the International Union of Geological Sciences (IUGS) to be of the highest scientific value.

Description
The sedimentary rock exposed in this dome ranges in age from Late Proterozoic within the center of the dome to Ordovician sandstone around its edges. The sedimentary rocks composing this structure dip outward at 10–20°. Differential erosion of resistant layers of quartzite has created high-relief circular cuestas. Its center consists of a siliceous breccia covering an area that is at least  in diameter.

Exposed within the interior of the Richat Structure is a variety of intrusive and extrusive igneous rocks. They include rhyolitic volcanic rocks, gabbros, carbonatites and kimberlites. The rhyolitic rocks consist of lava flows and hydrothermally altered tuffaceous rocks that are part of two distinct eruptive centers, which are interpreted to be the eroded remains of two maars. According to field mapping and aeromagnetic data, the gabbroic rocks form two concentric ring dikes. The inner ring dike is about 20 m in width and lies about 3 km from the center of the Richat Structure. The outer ring dike is about 50 m in width and lies about 7 to 8 km from the center of this structure. Thirty-two carbonatite dikes and sills have been mapped within the Richat Structure. The dikes are generally about 300 m long and typically 1 to 4 m wide. They consist of massive carbonatites that are mostly devoid of vesicles. The carbonatite rocks have been dated as having cooled between 94 and 104 million years ago. A kimberlitic plug and several sills have been found within the northern part of the Richat Structure. The kimberlite plug has been dated to around 99 million years old. These intrusive igneous rocks are interpreted as indicating the presence of a large alkaline igneous intrusion that currently underlies the Richat Structure and was created by uplifting the overlying rock.

Spectacular hydrothermal features are a part of the Richat Structure. They include the extensive hydrothermal alteration of rhyolites and gabbros and a central megabreccia created by hydrothermal dissolution and collapse. The siliceous megabreccia is at least 40 m thick in its center to only a few meters thick along its edges. The breccia consists of fragments of white to dark gray cherty material, quartz-rich sandstone, diagenetic cherty nodules, and stromatolitic limestone and is intensively silicified. The hydrothermal alteration, which created this breccia, has been dated to have occurred about 98.2 ± 2.6 million years ago using the 40Ar/39Ar method.

Interpretation
The Richat Structure is regarded by geologists as a highly symmetrical and deeply eroded geologic dome. It was first described in the 1930s to 1940s, as Richât Crater or Richât buttonhole (boutonnière du Richât). Richard-Molard (1948) considered it to be the result of a laccolithic uplift. A geological expedition to Mauritania led by Théodore Monod in 1952 recorded four "crateriform or circular irregularities" (accidents cratériformes ou circulaires) in the area, Er Richât, Aouelloul (south of Chinguetti), Temimichat-Ghallaman and Tenoumer. Origin of Er Richât as an impact structure (as is clearly the case with the other three) was briefly considered, but the closer study in the 1950s to 1960s suggested that it was formed by terrestrial processes. After extensive field and laboratory studies in the 1960s, no credible evidence has been found for shock metamorphism or any type of deformation indicative of a hypervelocity extraterrestrial impact. While coesite, an indicator of shock metamorphism, had initially been reported as being present in rock samples collected from the Richat Structure, further analysis of rock samples concluded that barite had been misidentified as coesite.

Work on dating the structure was done in the 1990s. Renewed study of the formation of the structure by Matton et al. (2005) and Matton (2008) confirmed the conclusion that it is not an impact structure. The circular distribution of ridges and valleys is explained as the formation of cuestas by the differential erosion of alternating hard and soft rock layers uplifted as a dome by an underlying alkaline igneous complex of Cretaceous age.

A 2011 multi-analytical study on the Richat megabreccias concluded that carbonates within the silica-rich megabreccias were created by low-temperature hydrothermal waters and that the structure requires special protection and further investigation of its origin.

IUGS geological heritage site
In respect of it being 'a spectacular example of a magmatic concentric alkaline complex', the International Union of Geological Sciences (IUGS) included the 'Richat Structure, a Cretaceous alkaline complex' in its assemblage of 100 'geological heritage sites' around the world in a listing published in October 2022. The organisation defines an IUGS Geological Heritage Site as 'a key place with geological elements and/or processes of international scientific relevance, used as a reference, and/or with a substantial contribution to the development of geological sciences through history.'

Archaeology 

The Richat Structure is the location of exceptional accumulations of Acheulean artifacts. These Acheulean archaeological sites are located along wadis that occupy outermost annular depression of this structure. Pre-Acheulean stone tools also have been found in the same areas. These sites are associated with rubbly outcrops of quartzite that provided the raw material needed for the manufacture of these artifacts. The most important Acheulean sites and their associated outcrops are found along the northwest of the outer ring, from which Wadi Akerdil heads east and Wadi Bamouere to the west. Sparse and widely scattered Neolithic spear points and other artifacts have also been found. However, since these sites were first discovered by Theodore Monod in 1974, mapping of artifacts within the area of the Richat Structure have found them to be generally absent in its innermost depressions. So far, neither recognizable midden deposits nor manmade structures have been recognized and reported from the Richat Structure. This is interpreted as indicating that the area of the Richat Structure was used for only short-term hunting and stone tool manufacturing. The local, apparent wealth of surface artifacts are the result of the concentration and mixing by deflation over multiple glacial-interglacial cycles.

Artifacts are found, typically redeposited, deflated, or both, in Late Pleistocene to early Holocene gravelly mud, muddy gravel, clayey sand, and silty sand. These sediments are often cemented into either concretionary masses or beds by calcrete. Ridges typically consist of deeply weathered bedrock representing truncated Cenozoic paleosols that formed under tropical environments. The Pleistocene to Middle Holocene sediments occur along wadis as the thin, meter- to less-than-meter-thick accumulations in the interior annular depressions to  accumulations along the wadis in the outermost annular depression of the Richat Structure. The gravelly deposits consist of a mixture of slope scree, debris flow, and fluviatile or even torrential flow deposits. The finer-grained, sandy deposits consist of eolian and playa lake deposits. The latter contain well-preserved freshwater fossils. Numerous concordant radiocarbon dates indicate that the bulk of these sediments accumulated between 15,000 and 8,000 BP during the African humid period. These deposits lie directly upon deeply eroded and weathered bedrock.

Notes

References

External links

 Anonymous (nd) Earth’s Bulls-Eye, the Eye of Africa, Landmark for Astronauts. Love These Pics
 Anonymous (nd) Richat Structure, Mauritania NASA Earth Observatory
 Discovery - Richat's Enigma (French), a video documentary from Radio Canada.
 Nemiroff, R., and J. Bonnell (2002) Earth's Richat Structure, Astronomy Picture of the Day, October 28, 2002. Astronomy Picture of the Day, Michigan Technological University, Houghton, Michigan.

Adrar Region
Geology of Mauritania
Geography of Mauritania
Regional geology
Structural geology
Tiris Zemmour Region
Geologic domes
Sahara
First 100 IUGS Geological Heritage Sites